Vlachogianni is a village and a community of the Elassona municipality, in Greece. Before the 2011 local government reform it was a part of the municipality of Potamia, of which it was a municipal district and the seat. The 2011 census recorded 895 inhabitants in the village. The community of Vlachogianni covers an area of 33.974 km2.

History
In the Ottoman tahrir defteri (number 101) of 1521, the settlement is recorded as a village with the name . In 1531, Vlachogianni is mentioned in an Ottoman bey's will.  In the end of the 16th century the main occupation of the people's residents was the cultivation of Cannabis sativa. In the beginning of the 19th century the village became a chiflik of Ali Pasha.

In the early 1900s, Vlachogianni was being used as a winter residence by semi-nomadic Aromanians; they were Farsherots, and Pindeans from certain villages in the region of Grevena. Between 1913 and 1914, there were 268 Aromanians that were wintering in Vlachogianni, out of a total population of 689 residents.

Economy
The population of Vlachogianni is occupied in animal husbandry and agriculture (mainly tobacco).

Population
According to the 2011 census, the population of the settlement of Vlachogianni was 895 people, a figure almost stable compared with the population of the previous census of 2001.

See also
 List of settlements in the Larissa regional unit

References

Populated places in Larissa (regional unit)
Aromanian settlements in Greece